Kembé Airport  is an airstrip serving Kembé, a village in the Basse-Kotto prefecture of the Central African Republic. The runway is just west of the village.

The Kembe non-directional beacon (Ident: KB) is located on the field.

See also

Transport in the Central African Republic
List of airports in the Central African Republic

References

External links 
OpenStreetMap - Kembé
OurAirports - Kembé Airport

Airports in the Central African Republic
Buildings and structures in Basse-Kotto